Porta Furba is a station on Line A of the Rome Metro. It is located under the intersection of Via Tuscolana, Via dei Fulvi and Via Monte del Grano.

References

Rome Metro Line A stations
Railway stations opened in 1980
1980 establishments in Italy
Rome Q. VIII Tuscolano
Railway stations in Italy opened in the 20th century